This is a list of dams and reservoirs in the U.S. state of Idaho.

See also

 List of lakes of Idaho
 List of dams in the Columbia River watershed

 
 
Idaho
Dams
Dams